Enver Čolaković (27 May 1913 – 18 August 1976) was a Bosnian novelist, poet and translator, best known for his 1944 novel The Legend of Ali-Pasha. During the later stages of World War II he served as a cultural attaché to the Independent State of Croatia embassy in Budapest. After the war he spent the rest of his life in Zagreb, where he published a number of literary translations from Hungarian and German.

Biography
Born in Budapest in 1913 to Bosniak father Vejsil-beg Čolaković and Hungarian mother Ilona (née Mednyanszki), Čolaković spent his childhood traveling around the region, and after World War I he settled in Sarajevo. He was a student of physics and mathematics in Budapest and history in Zagreb. Between 1931 and 1939, Čolaković wrote in the Hungarian and German languages. Between 1939 and 1941, his works were published by a number of magazines based in Sarajevo and Zagreb, such as Osvit (Dawn), Hrvatski misao (The Croatian Thought), Hrvatski narod (The Croatian People), Hrvatsko kolo (The Croatian Circuit) and Novi behar (The New Blossom). Čolaković also wrote a series of essays and reviews in which he advocated rights for Bosniaks. His comedy Moja žena krpi čarape was performed at the Sarajevo National Theatre in 1943 and later at the Banja Luka Theatre in 1944.

His novel The Legend of Ali-Pasha (1944) was awarded with Matica hrvatska (Matrix Croatica) Award. In 1944 he was appointed cultural attaché at the embassy of the Axis-allied Independent State of Croatia in Budapest. In a 1971 interview, Čolaković stated: "I began writing The Legend of Ali Pasha with a specific purpose - to preserve our  Bosnian language. Not the language of denominations or peoples of Bosnia, but the language of Bosnia. I also wanted to re-create a historical period of Bosnia."

After World War II he was arrested in Sarajevo, detained in Zagreb, and eventually released. He later worked as an editor at the Publishing Institute of Croatia until 1946. Between 1952 and 1954, he was an editor at the Croatian Lexicographical Institute. Since he was not allowed to publish original works, he translated literary works from other languages. He translated Hungarian, Austrian and Hebrew poetry. For his enormous body of translations of Hungarian and Austrian authors, he was awarded the Hungarian Petőfi Award and the Austrian Decoration for Science and Art in 1970. He translated the novels of Ervin Šinko and Gyula Illyés, Zoltán Kodály's oratorio Psalmus Hungaricus and Richard Wagner's opera Die Meistersinger von Nürnberg. Together with his wife Stella Čolaković he also created many classical music programs for radio broadcast.

Čolaković was member of Matica hrvatska, Croatian Writers' Association, the Association of Literary Translators and the Yugoslav branch of the International PEN. He was among writers who signed the Declaration on the Name and Status of the Croatian Literary Language.

Enver Čolaković died in Zagreb on 18 August 1976 of a heart attack. A square and park in Zagreb, Croatia, and a street in Sarajevo, and several schools in Bosnia and Herzegovina are named after him. In 1970, Čolaković was awarded the Austrian Cross of Honour for Science and Art, 1st class

Works
Legenda o Ali-paši, Zagreb 1944, 1970, 1989, Sarajevo 1991, 1997, 1998.
 Moja žena krpi čarape, salonska komedija, 1943.
Mali svijet, Zagreb 1991.
Gyula Illyés, Poezija, Zagreb 1971. 
Zoltán Csuka, Moje dvije domovine, Sarajevo 1972. 
Zoltán Csuka, Poezija, Zagreb 1975. 
Zlatna knjiga mađarske poezije, Zagreb 1978. 
Izabrane pjesme, Zagreb 1990. 
Lokljani. Iz Bosne o Bosni, Zagreb 1991.
Bosni, Zagreb, 1998
" Jedinac", Novel in verses, Zagreb 2001
"Knjiga majci", Novel, Zagreb, 2013.

References
Notes

Bibliography
 
 

1913 births
1976 deaths
Writers from Budapest
Bosniak writers
Bosniak poets
Bosnia and Herzegovina writers
Burials at Mirogoj Cemetery
Recipients of the Austrian Cross of Honour for Science and Art, 1st class
University of Belgrade alumni
Faculty of Humanities and Social Sciences, University of Zagreb alumni
20th-century Hungarian poets
Bosnia and Herzegovina people of Bosniak descent
Bosnia and Herzegovina people of Hungarian descent
Cultural attachés
Yugoslav writers